General Provost of the Islamic Revolutionary Guard Corps is the provost and military police with an authority within all military branches of the Islamic Revolutionary Guard Corps and Basij militia. It is a subdivision to the Joint Staff of IRGC.

References

Military provosts
Military police of Iran
Islamic Revolutionary Guard Corps